Sheth (also Seth) is an Indian surname, found in northern India and in Gujarat, Maharashtra and West Bengal. It derives from Sanskrit श्रेष्ठिन्, meaning "banker/head of a guild". 

It may also be a variant of the Western European surname Seth; if Scottish or Irish,a reduced Anglicized form of Gaelic Mac Sithigh or Ó Síthigh (see Sheehy); or of the Indian surnames Shah or Shett.

Notable people with this surname include:
Brian Sheth, American businessman
Jagdish Sheth, professor at Emory University
Sheetal Sheth, American actress
Vatsal Sheth, Bollywood actor

See also
Sethi
Shett
Chettiar
Seth (surname)

References

Indian surnames
Surnames of Indian origin
Hindu surnames
Gujarati-language surnames
Surnames of Hindustani origin